Muhammad Ali (born 10 April 1985) is an Indonesian footballer who currently plays for PSAP Sigli in the Indonesia Super League.

Club statistics

References

External links

1985 births
Association football defenders
Association football midfielders
Living people
Indonesian footballers
Liga 1 (Indonesia) players
PSAP Sigli players
Indonesian Premier Division players
Place of birth missing (living people)